Events from the year 1726 in art.

Events
 A silver statue of the Annunciation is sculpted in Augsburg for Mariánská Týnice, on the order of Abbot Eugen Tittl; it was later melted down for coins, along with the rest of the church's treasures.

Paintings
 Elias Gottlob Haussmann – Gottfried Reiche
 Sebastiano Ricci
 Moses make water gush from the rock 
 Susanna in front of Daniel
 Johann Heinrich Tischbein – Portrait of the Artist's first Wife, Marie Sophie Robert

Births
 February 7 – Margaret Fownes-Luttrell, English painter (died 1766)
 March 24 – Johanna Marie Fosie, Danish painter and first professional native female artist in Denmark (died 1764)
 April 18 (baptised) – François-Thomas Germain, French silversmith (died 1791)
 May 20 – Francis Cotes, English painter (died 1770)
 August 24 - Peter Cramer, Danish book illustrator, decorative and theatrical painter (died 1782)
 October 15 – Françoise Duparc, Spanish born Baroque painter who later lived in France (died 1778)
 October 16 – Daniel Chodowiecki, Polish painter (died 1801)
 November 30 – Jacques Aliamet, French engraver (died 1788)
 date unknown
 John Baker, English flower painter (died 1771)
 Michel-Bruno Bellengé, French painter (died 1793)
 Giovanni Battista Brostoloni, Italian engraver (died unknown)
 Gabriel François Doyen, French painter (died 1806)
 Katsukawa Shunshō, Japanese painter and printmaker in the ukiyo-e style (died 1792)
 François-Gaspard Teuné, French ébéniste (cabinet-maker) (died 1788)
 Antonio Zucchi, Italian painter of the Neoclassic period (died 1795)
 probable
 Odvardt Helmoldt von Lode, Danish painter and engraver (died 1757)

Deaths
 February 18 – Jacques Carrey, French painter and draughtsman (born 1649)
 April 13 – Antonio Palomino, Spanish painter, writer on art theory, and biographer of artists (born 1653)
 August 13 – Anthoni Schoonjans, Belgian painter (born 1655)
 October 10 – Tommaso Redi, Italian painter, active in his native Florence (born 1665)
 November 15 – Giacomo del Po, Italian painter of emblematical and allegorical subjects (born 1654)
 November 22 – Anton Domenico Gabbiani, Italian painter born in Florence (born 1652)
 December 14 – François Dumont, French sculptor (born 1688)
 date unknown
 Teodoro Ardemans, Spanish architect and painter (born unknown)
 François Barois, French sculptor (born 1656)
 Antonio Bellucci (or Antonijus Belutis), painter from Treviso (born 1654)
 Jiao Bingzhen, Chinese painter of the Qing dynasty (born 1689)
 Gregorio De Ferrari, Italian painter of the Genoese school (born 1647)
 Girolamo Gatti, Italian painter (born 1682)
 Sébastien Slodtz, French sculptor (born 1655)
 Pier Lorenzo Spoleti, Italian painter of portraits and reproductions of old masters (born 1680)

References

 
Years of the 18th century in art
1720s in art